Anthony Jerome Griffin (April 1, 1866 – January 13, 1935) was an American lawyer, war veteran, and politician from New York. He served ten terms in the U.S. House of Representatives from 1918 to 1935.

Life
He attended City College, Cooper Union, and New York University School of Law. He was admitted to the bar in 1892, and practiced in New York City.

Spanish-American War 
Griffin organized and commanded Company F, Sixty-ninth Regiment, New York Volunteer Infantry, in the Spanish–American War in 1898 and 1899. He founded and edited the Bronx Independent from 1905 to 1907.

State legislature 
Griffin was member of the State Senate (22nd D.) from 1911 to 1914, sitting in the 134th, 135th, 136th and 137th New York State Legislatures.

He was a delegate to the New York State Constitutional Convention of 1915.

Congress 
Griffin was elected as a Democrat to the 65th United States Congress to fill the vacancy caused by the resignation of Henry Bruckner. He was re-elected to the 66th and to the eight succeeding Congresses, and held office from March 5, 1918, until his death on January 13, 1935, in New York City.

Death and burial at Arlington National Cemetery 
Griffin was buried at Arlington National Cemetery, Arlington, Virginia.

See also
 List of United States Congress members who died in office (1900–49)

References

Sources

1866 births
1935 deaths
Democratic Party New York (state) state senators
Cooper Union alumni
New York University School of Law alumni
Burials at Arlington National Cemetery
American military personnel of the Spanish–American War
Democratic Party members of the United States House of Representatives from New York (state)
Politicians from the Bronx